Royal town may refer to:

A place with royal patronage in the United Kingdom
Royal burgh, in Scotland
 Royal city in Polish–Lithuanian Commonwealth, a historical type of city

See also
Royal City (disambiguation)